Sebastián Fernández (born 1985) is an Uruguayan footballer.

Sebastián Fernández may also refer to:

Sebastián Fernández (footballer, born 1989), Uruguayan footballer
Sebastián Fernández (golfer) (born 1973), Argentine golfer
Sebastián Fernández (racing driver) (born 2000), Venezuelan racing driver
Sebastián Fernández (rower), Argentine rower
Sebastián Fernández (volleyball) (born 1978), Argentine volleyball player